MWH may stand for:
 International Air Transport Association airport code for Grant County International Airport
 MWH Global, an international water engineering consultancy

See also
MWh, a megawatt hour of energy
mWh, a milliwatt hour of energy